St. Cecilia Mass is the common name of a solemn mass in G major by Charles Gounod, composed in 1855 and scored for three soloists, mixed choir, orchestra and organ. The work was assigned CG 56 in the catalogue of the composer's works.

History 

The first work by Gounod performed in public was on 1 May 1841 a mass at the church of San Luigi dei Francesi, Rome. The St. Cecilia Mass was his first major work. Gounod's new music was acclaimed in the press, rendering details and culminating in an enthusiastic summary: "It is ... the work of a thoroughly trained artist – and what is more, the poetry of a new poet". The review was published in Paris and raised expectations. The premiere was performed on St. Cecilia's day, 22 November 1855, in Saint-Eustache, Paris, where it was customary to celebrate the day by the performance of a new mass. The conductor was Théophile Tilmant.

Text 

The Order of Mass is slightly extended. In the Gloria, the prayer  (have mercy on us) is intensified by an added Domine Jesu (Lord Jesus). The mass has an instrumental offertory. In the Agnus Dei, the soloists sing between the three invocations the text "" (Lord, I am not worthy to receive you, but only say a word and I shall be healed), sung once by the tenor, once by the soprano. The movement ends with an added Amen. The changes have been criticized as not liturgically strict.

Scoring and structure 

The vocal parts of the mass are performed by three soloists (soprano, tenor and bass) and a choir of four parts, sometimes with divided tenor and bass. The soloists act mostly as an ensemble, without arias. Gounod scored the mass for a large orchestra, demanding six harps. In Gloria and Sanctus, he highlighted passages by pistons (cornets), typical instruments of the romantic French orchestra. In Benedictus and Agnus Dei, he was the first composer to use the newly developed octobass, a string instrument of the violone family. He included the great organ, mostly in Grand jeu.

In the following table of the movements, the markings, keys and time signatures are taken from the choral score, using the symbol for alla breve (2/2).

Reception 

Camille Saint-Saens commented after the premiere: 

He ranked the mass among the best works by Gounod: 

The Sanctus was used in Werner Herzog's film Nosferatu the Vampyre (1979).

Selected recordings 

 Igor Markevitch, Irmgard Seefried, Gerhard Stolze, Hermann Uhde, Tschechischer Sängerchor Prag – Tschechische Philharmonie, recorded in Prague, 1965
 Jean-Claude Hartemann, Pilar Lorengar, Heinz Hoppe, Franz Crass, Orchestre de la Société des Concerts du Conservatoire, recorded in St. Roch before 1963
 Mariss Jansons, Luba Orgonášová, Christian Elsner, Gustáv Beláček, Bavarian Radio Chorus and Radio Symphony Orchestra, recorded live at Herkulessaal, Munich, in 2007

References

Sources

External links 

 Max Derrickson: Gounod – Messe solennelle de Sainte Cécile musicprogramnotes.com

Compositions by Charles Gounod
Masses (music)
1855 compositions
Compositions in G major